Morgan Göransson (born 24 November 1972) is a Swedish cross-country skier who competed from 1993 to 2002. His best World Cup finish was fifth in a 10 km event in Italy in 1994.

Göransson also competed in at the 2002 Winter Olympics in Salt Lake City where he finished 13th in the 4 ×10 km relay event, 27th in the 15 km event, and not finishing the 30 km event. He finished 23rd in the 10 km + 10 km combined pursuit at the FIS Nordic World Ski Championships 2001 in Lahti.

Cross-country skiing results
All results are sourced from the International Ski Federation (FIS).

Olympic Games

World Championships

World Cup

Season standings

Team podiums

 3 podiums

References

External links

1972 births
Living people
People from Östersund Municipality
Cross-country skiers from Jämtland County
Cross-country skiers at the 2002 Winter Olympics
Olympic cross-country skiers of Sweden
Swedish male cross-country skiers